Moscovei is a commune in Cahul District, Moldova. It is composed of two villages, Moscovei and Trifeștii Noi.

References

Communes of Cahul District
Bulgarian communities in Moldova